The Alarm (Indian Alarm) is a Bronze statue by  John J. Boyle located in Lincoln Park, Chicago.

It was commissioned in 1880, and dedicated on May 17, 1884.

On the base are four incised granite tablets with scenes of Ottawa life: "The Peace Pipe," "The Corn Dance," "Forestry," and "The Hunt."

History

The sculpture was given to Lincoln Park by Martin Ryerson. It was display in the Lincoln Park Zoo, about one mile south of the current location, until 1974. Ryerson gave the sculpture as a memorial to the Ottawa Nation. It is the oldest sculpture on Chicago Park District property.

The inscription reads:
(Base front:) 
Presented to Lincoln Park by Martin Ryerson. 
(Base, on one granite tablet:) 
The Peace Pipe 
(Base, on another granite tablet:) 
The Corn Dance 
(Base, on another granite table:) 
Forestry 
(Base, on another granite table:) 
The Hunt signed

See also
 List of public art in Chicago

References

Further reading
West, Myron H., An Illustrated Guide of Lincoln Park, Chicago: Gunthrop-Warren Printing, Co., 1911

External links
Lincoln Park: Indian Alarm - by John J. Boyle, Public Art in Chicago, March 12, 2010
The Alarm - Chicago IL

1884 establishments in Illinois
1884 sculptures
Bronze sculptures in Illinois
Sculptures of dogs in the United States
Monuments and memorials in Chicago
Sculptures of Native Americans in Illinois
Outdoor sculptures in Chicago
Sculptures of men in Illinois
Sculptures of women in Illinois
Statues in Chicago